Psiadia schweinfurthii is an extinct species of flowering plant in the family Asteraceae. It was found only in Yemen.

References

schweinfurthii
Endemic flora of Socotra
Extinct plants
Extinct biota of Africa
Extinct biota of Asia
Endemic flora of Yemen
Taxonomy articles created by Polbot
Taxa named by Isaac Bayley Balfour